Max Labovitch (January 18, 1924 – January 14, 2018) was a Canadian professional ice hockey player. He was Jewish.

Biography
Labovitch played professional hockey for ten years, and missed two seasons due to military service (1942–43 and 1944–45). In 1941–42, he played for the New Haven Eagles of the American Hockey League. In 1943–44 he saw time with both the New York Rangers and the New York Rovers.  In 1945, he played for the Vancouver Pros and the Stan Evan Orioles of Winnipeg. 
He did not retire from hockey until after the 1949–50 season. That year, he had 42 points in 49 games for the Toledo Buckeyes of the IHL.

Labovitch was inducted in the Manitoba Hockey Hall of Fame in February 2001. He died in January 2018 at the age of 93.

See also
International Hockey League (1945–2001)
List of select Jewish ice hockey players

References

External links
newyorkrangers.com
hockeydb
cbc
jewsinsports.org
legendsofhockey.net

1924 births
2018 deaths
Canadian ice hockey right wingers
Canadian military personnel of World War II
Jewish Canadian sportspeople
Jewish ice hockey players
New York Rovers players
Ice hockey people from Winnipeg
Canadian expatriate ice hockey players in the United States